Yara Kastelijn (born 9 August 1997) is a Dutch racing cyclist, who currently competes in cyclo-cross for UCI Cyclo-cross Team Credishop–Fristads, and in road cycling for UCI Women's Continental Team . In 2019, she won the elite race at the European Cyclo-cross Championships.

Major results

Road

2015
 1st  Time trial, National Junior Championships
 3rd Time trial, UEC European Junior Championships
 8th Road race, UCI World Junior Championships
2016
 1st Stage 2a (TTT) Giro del Trentino Alto Adige-Südtirol
2017
 8th 7-Dorpenomloop Aalburg
2018
 7th Road race, UEC European Under-23 Championships
2021
 10th Overall Tour of Norway
2022
 7th Overall Tour de Romandie
 9th La Flèche Wallonne

Cyclo-cross

2013–2014
 2nd Surhuisterveen
 2nd Milan
2016–2017
 2nd Surhuisterveen
2017–2018
 3rd National Under-23 Championships
2018–2019
 Toi Toi Cup
1st Mlada Boleslav
 1st Pfaffnau
 2nd Pétange
 2nd La Meziere
2019–2020
 1st  UEC European Championships
 Superprestige
1st Gavere
3rd Gieten
3rd Zonhoven
3rd Diegem
 3rd Overall DVV Trophy
1st Koppenberg
3rd Ronse
 1st Wachtebeke
 Ethias Cross
2nd Kruibeke
 Rectavit Series
2nd Neerpelt
 2nd Gullegem
 UCI World Cup
3rd Tábor
3rd Koksijde
2020–2021
 Ethias Cross
2nd Kruibeke
 X²O Badkamers Trophy
3rd Koppenberg
3rd Kortrijk
2021–2022
 Ethias Cross
1st Beringen
2nd Bredene
 3rd  UEC European Championships
2022–2023
 Exact Cross
3rd Essen

See also
 List of 2016 UCI Women's Teams and riders

References

External links
 

1997 births
Living people
Dutch female cyclists
People from Deurne, Netherlands
Cyclo-cross cyclists
Cyclists from North Brabant